Roman is a town in northwestern Bulgaria near the city of Pravets and about 90 km northeast of the capital of Bulgaria, Sofia. It is located in Vratsa Province and is known for the big steel factory, producing 100,000 tons of steel a year. The raw materials come from the Kremikovtsi factory near Sofia. As of December 2009, the town has a population of 3,157 inhabitants.

Roman Knoll on Trinity Peninsula in Antarctica is named after the town.

References

Towns in Bulgaria
Populated places in Vratsa Province